Otiorhynchus gemmatus is a species in the weevil family (Curculionidae).

Description 
The basic color is black, with small white spots on the elytra.

Distribution and habitat 
This species inhabits the mountains of most of Europe.

References 

 Biolib
 Fauna Europaea
 EoL

Entiminae
Beetles described in 1763
Taxa named by Giovanni Antonio Scopoli